Spark Seeker is an album by American reggae singer Matisyahu (Matthew Miller), which was released on July 17, 2012. It is his fourth studio release, and follows 2009's Light. Spark Seeker debuted at #19 on the Billboard 200 with first week sales of 16,000. It debuted at #1 on the Billboard Reggae Chart. The album was recorded in Los Angeles, California, and Tel Aviv, Israel. Miller considers Spark Seeker to be his attempt at a pop album.

The vinyl LP version of the record was pressed at United Record Pressing in Nashville, TN.

Cover art 
The cover for Spark Seeker is a picture of a girl who was found in the Judean Desert, taken by Mary Margaret Chambliss, the wife of Matisyahu's agent. Yossi Belkin, the graphic designer behind the cover art, claimed that "the girl was happy and had a sparkle in her eye," to which Miller claimed "that's it, she is the spark seeker." Belkin claims that she gave the album a "pure, fresh, and young feel," and that after going through "dozens of drafts," this one was the "most iconic," Belkin considers this cover to be his proudest work, as of August 1, 2012. Belkin also designed the cover for Matisyahu's 2011's EP The Miracle.

It appears the girl is from a nomadic Muslim Bedouin family. It is unknown [to the editor of this section] if the family was compensated [monetarily].

Track listing

Personnel
 Matisyahu – vocals
 Ravid Khalani – vocals on "King Crown of Judah"
 Kool Kojak – production
 Jack Knight – Songwriting, Production,Background Vocals
 J. Ralph – vocals on "Crossroads"
 Shyne – vocals on "Buffalo Soldier" and "King Crown of Judah"
Rabbi Hagay Batzri – Vocals, vocals (background)
Noa Neve- Vocals on "summer Wind"

Charts

Spark Seeker: Acoustic Sessions

On January 29, 2013, Matisyahu released Spark Seeker: Acoustic Sessions, a six-song EP that features acoustic versions of songs from Spark Seeker. The iTunes versions includes an exclusive seventh track, "Silence."

Track listing

References

Matisyahu albums
2012 albums
Electronic albums by American artists